Phoenix High School is a secondary alternative school located in Elgin, Texas, in the Elgin Independent School District. The school serves all of EISD, including the city of Elgin, as well as portions of Travis County, Lee County and northern Bastrop County. In 2015, the school was rated "Met Alternative Standard" by the Texas Education Agency.

Phoenix High School is an alternative school and does not have school team sports;

References

External links
Official Website

Schools in Bastrop County, Texas
Schools in Travis County, Texas
Schools in Lee County, Texas
Public high schools in Texas
Alternative schools in the United States